Kittelsen is a surname. Notable people with the surname include:

Agnes Kittelsen (born 1980), Norwegian actress
Erling Kittelsen (born 1946), Norwegian poet, novelist, children's writer, playwright and translator
Grete Prytz Kittelsen (1917-2010), Norwegian goldsmith, enamel artist, and designer 
Theodor Kittelsen (1857–1914), Norwegian artist